Gannett Peak is the highest mountain peak in the U.S. state of Wyoming at . It lies in the Wind River Range within the Bridger Wilderness of the Bridger-Teton National Forest.

Overview
Geographically, Gannett Peak is the apex of the entire Central Rockies, the largely continuous chain of mountains occupying the states of Wyoming, Idaho and Montana. Named in 1906 for American geographer Henry Gannett, the peak is also the high point of the Wind River Range. The mountain slopes are located in both Bridger-Teton National Forest and Shoshone National Forest.

Gannett is the highest peak within what is better known as the Greater Yellowstone Ecosystem and is the highest peak in the Rocky Mountains outside of Colorado. The  Gannett Glacier, which is likely the largest single glacier in the American portion of the Rocky Mountains, extends across the northern slopes of the mountain. Minor Glacier is situated in the western cirque of the peak while Dinwoody and Gooseneck Glaciers can be found on the southeast side of the mountain.

Gannett Peak is in the heart of a remote and rugged wilderness.  Because of this, its elevation, and extreme weather, it is often considered by mountaineers to be one of the most difficult U.S. state high points to reach, after Denali and possibly Granite Peak.

Hazards

Encountering bears is a concern in the Wind River Range. There are other concerns as well, including bugs, wildfires, adverse snow conditions and nighttime cold temperatures.

Importantly, there have been notable incidents, including accidental deaths, due to falls from steep cliffs (a misstep could be fatal in this class 4/5 terrain) and due to falling rocks, over the years, including 1993, 2007 (involving an experienced NOLS leader), 2015 and 2018. Other incidents include a seriously injured backpacker being airlifted near SquareTop Mountain in 2005, and a fatal hiker incident (from an apparent accidental fall) in 2006 that involved state search and rescue. The U.S. Forest Service does not offer updated aggregated records on the official number of fatalities in the Wind River Range.

See also
 List of mountain peaks of the United States
 List of Ultras of the United States

References

External links

 
 
 

Bridger–Teton National Forest
Highest points of U.S. states
Mountains of Fremont County, Wyoming
Mountains of Sublette County, Wyoming
Mountains of Wyoming
Shoshone National Forest
North American 4000 m summits